George Asbury Owens (March 4, 1861 – June 1, 1936) was an American politician from New York.

Life 
Owens was born on March 4, 1861, in New York City. He initially worked as a cooper, and later became an agent for a brewery in Brooklyn.

In 1893, Owens was elected to the New York State Senate as a Republican, representing New York's 4th State Senate district. He served in the State Senate in 1894 and 1895. He was a delegate to the 1904 Republican National Convention.

Owens held a number of public positions over the years, and worked for the New York State Comptroller's office, served as a Kings County Deputy Sheriff, and was Deputy Commissioner of Records for 10 years. After he retired from the latter position in 1926, he moved to New Kingston, where he became active in local politics and served as Collector of Taxes when he died.

Owens was married twice, first to Jane Morrison, and then to Jane Ballantine after the former died. His three sons were John R., Sylvester M., and James Sherman.

Owens died at his New Kingston home on June 1, 1936. He was buried in the family plot in Cypress Hills Cemetery.

References

External links 

 The Political Graveyard

1861 births
1936 deaths
Politicians from Brooklyn
19th-century American politicians
Republican Party New York (state) state senators
People from Delaware County, New York
Burials at Cypress Hills Cemetery